Highway M24 is a Ukrainian international highway (M-highway) connecting the city of Mukacheve to the southern village of Astei on the border with Hungary. The route is relatively short and located entirely within Zakarpattia.

Throughout most of its length on a segment between Mukacheve and Berehove, it is part of European routes European route E58 and European route E81. Before 2013 it was designated as P54.

Route

See also

 Roads in Ukraine
 Ukraine Highways
 International E-road network
 Hungary-Ukraine border

References

External links
 International Roads in Ukraine in Russian
 European Roads in Russian

Roads in Zakarpattia Oblast